Todd Howard is an American video game designer, director, and producer.

Todd Howard may also refer to:

 Todd Howard (American football) (born 1965), American football linebacker and coach

 Todd Howard (basketball) (born 1970), American college basketball coach
 Todd Howard (TV personality) (born 1965), American entrepreneur